Michael Bell Cox (11 October 1826 – 26 July 1897)  was an Anglican priest in Ireland during the Nineteenth Century.

Cox was educated at Trinity College, Dublin. He was ordained in 1851. He became the incumbent at Glenties in 1856; and was  Archdeacon of Raphoe from 1877 until July 1897. He was then appointed Dean of Raphoe  in the Province of Armagh in the Church of Ireland but died before consecration.

References

19th-century Irish Anglican priests
People from County Donegal
1897 deaths
Alumni of Trinity College Dublin
Deans of Raphoe
Archdeacons of Raphoe
1826 births